Morebath is an upland village in the county of Devon, England. It is mostly given over to sheep-farming, and situated on the southern edge of Exmoor.

An account of life in Morebath in the 16th century can be read in The Voices of Morebath: Reformation and Rebellion in an English Village by Eamon Duffy (published in 2001 by Yale University Press). Then, as now, Morebath was populated by no more than 300 people, drawn from some thirty families, living and working on the land. During the often turbulent period of the Reformation, its inhabitants relied on the guidance of their priest, Christopher Trychay, Vicar of Morebath from 1520 to 1574. His detailed hand-written records were transcribed by the Rev. J. Erskine Binney, and published by James G. Commin of Exeter in 1904 as a separate volume in the Devon Notes & Queries series, under the title The Accounts of the Wardens of the Parish of Morebath, Devon. They provide an insight into the life of this small English community. The church is dedicated to St. George.

The village was formerly served by two railway stations. Morebath railway station (initially opened in 1873 as "Morebath and Bampton") on the Devon and Somerset Railway was actually nearer to Shillingford, and about a mile-and-a-half from Morebath itself. Morebath Junction Halt, which opened in 1928, was a single-platform halt set among fields in the valley beyond Ashtown Farm, and had no access road, though there was a footpath to it from Ashtown, which extended along the edge of fields to Chilpark on the B3190, close to the main part of the village. It was served by the Exe Valley Railway, as well as the Devon and Somerset line, and therefore had a better service than Morebath railway station: it was also much closer to Morebath village itself. Both stations closed in 1966.

The actress Caroline Quentin resides in the village with her family.

References

External links

Villages in Mid Devon District